Uruzgan helicopter attack refers to the February 21, 2010, killing of many Afghan civilians, including over twenty men, four women and one child, by United States Army with another 12 civilians wounded. The attack took place near the border between Uruzgan and Daykundi province in Afghanistan when special operation troops helicopters attacked three minibuses with "airborne weapons".

Summary of events 
The victims were traveling in three buses in broad daylight in a group of 42 civilians in Uruzgan province near the border to Daykundi on February 21, 2010 . When the convoy was on a main road in the village of Zerma it came under attack from U.S. Special Forces piloting Little Bird helicopters using "airborne weapons". NATO later stated that they believed at that time that the minibuses were carrying insurgents. 27 civilians including four women and one child were killed in the attack while another 12 were wounded. Initially the number of deaths was reported at 33. ISAF ground troops transported the wounded to medical treatment facilities after they found women and children at the scene.

Reaction

Afghanistan 
Afghanistan's cabinet called the killings "unjustifiable" and condemned the raid "in the strongest terms possible". The local governor and the Interior Minister said that all of the victims were civilians. Amanullah Hotak, head of Uruzgan's provincial council said: "We don't want their apologies or the money they always give after every attack. We want them to kill all of us together instead of doing it to us one by one." Haji Ghullam Rasoul, whose cousins died in the attack, said, "They came here to bring security but they kill our children, they kill our brothers and they kill our people."

United States 
U.S. General Stanley McChrystal said he was "extremely saddened". "I have made it clear to our forces that we are here to protect the Afghan people, and inadvertently killing or injuring civilians undermines their trust and confidence in our mission," he said in a statement. "We will re-double our efforts to regain that trust."

Netherlands 
A Dutch Defense Ministry spokesman in The Hague said Dutch forces did not call the airstrike, which took place in an area under Dutch military control.

See also
Azizabad airstrike
Haska Meyna wedding party airstrike
Granai airstrike
2009 Kunduz airstrike
Sangin airstrike

References

External links 
Another Massacre In Afghanistan Bill Van Auken
Questions linger after airstrike on civilian convoy in Afghanistan Steve Rennie
Afghans call for Nato to leave after airstrike kills 27 civilians Jerome Starkey, Kabul

2010 in Afghanistan
Airstrikes during the War in Afghanistan (2001–2021)
Civilian casualties in the War in Afghanistan (2001–2021)
History of Urozgan Province
February 2010 events in Afghanistan
Helicopter attacks
Attacks in Afghanistan in 2010
2010 airstrikes